Fiona Spence is an Australian stage and television actress and drama teacher. She is known for her television roles including Prisoner (1979–81) as Gestapo like prison officer Vera Bennett and Home and Away as the unlucky in love spinster Celia Stewart (1988–90). She has made numerous returns to Home and Away reprising her role of Celia. Her other television roles include Packed to the Rafters as Eleanor McCormick (2013).

Early life
Spence was born in Bromley, Kent, (now in Greater London)  England to an Irish mother and an Australian-born father serving with the British Army. When her father finally left the service, Spence and her family (including her sister-in-law, casting director Kerry Spence) moved to Hong Kong when she was three and then to Australia when she was six. After leaving school, she was trained as a secretary and later traveled to Montreal where she was a hostess for the Australia Pavilion (Expo 67) at the Canadian Expo.

After living in Canada for a year, she left for England and lived in London for a time working as a saleswoman for the Fortnum & Mason department store. It was while seeing several plays in London's West End, she became interested in acting. She was engaged aged 22, but broke it off. After returning to Australia, wanting to become an actress, she trained with The Independent Theatre.

Early career
Spence began acting professionally during the late 1970s. She became engaged a second time, but again the relationship ended around 1978. While living in Sydney, she appeared in her first television role in the teen drama Glenview High in 1977.

Television roles

Prisoner (Prisoner Cell Block H)
In 1979 she first found fame playing the sad and sadistic, authoritarian prison officer Vera Bennett, in cult soap opera Prisoner. It was on the set of Prisoner that she first met her long-term life partner, scriptwriter Denise Morgan. They remained together until Morgan's death in 2011. The character of Vera Bennett, the show's main villain, was nicknamed "Vinegar Tits" by the inmates. The role continued from the show's premiere in 1979 until 1981, appearing in episodes 1 to 224. In the first episode she was coldly sad. Later developments showed other more sensitive angles of her personality and explored the idea that her tough behaviour in the cell block was connected to her loneliness and social awkwardness outside the prison and caring for her elderly mother. Spence who played Vera with her hair in a tight bun, was hardly recognisable if she let her hair down. Spence herself commented she wasn't readily recognised in real life, as Vera whenever she wore her hair down.

When producer John McRae took over day-to-day running of the series in 1981, plans were made to write Spence out of the series. Her character had become immensely popular during her two-years on the show and, when news of her departure was announced, the Ten Network received at least 100 phone calls and countless fan mail asking for Spence to remain. Spence however quietly left the show later stating "I loved playing Vera. But it was time to wash that dame right out of my hair."

During her last year with the show, Spence appeared in supporting roles in both the television mini-series Women of the Sun and the television movie I Can Jump Puddles, which also featured a number of other former Prisoner co-stars including Sigrid Thornton, Sandy Gore, Lesley Baker and Anne Phelan.

Home and Away and others
From 1988 until 1990, Spence became well known for playing spinster Celia Stewart in Home and Away. While working on the show, she attended Monash University earning an arts degree in English. She also made sporadic television appearances during the next several years as a celebrity guest on game shows Cluedo and Sale of the Century as well as making a guest appearance on the television series Law of the Land and as Eleanor McCormick in Packed to the Rafters.

Theatre and pantomime
In March 1984, Spence starred alongside Geraldine Cook in the 60-minute "softcore feminist" black comedy Mums, at Melbourne's La Mama Theatre. The play was about the "manic lives" of two trapped women in a high-rise flat, in which Spence played the tough, aggressive Jo, while Cook played the more light-hearted Toots. She played Bonnie in the 1986 Melbourne Theatre Company production of the play Hurlyburly at the Russel Street Theatre.

She returned to the theatre in the early 1990s recreating the role of Vera Bennett in a British stage play version of Prisoner. She also starred in a theatrical pantomime of Aladdin with fellow Home and Away co-star Greg Benson at the Theatre Royal, in Hanley, Stoke-on-Trent during December 1991 and January 1992 as well as a short-lived stage show, Lipstick Dreams, in the United Kingdom.

Prisoner DVD commentary
A commentary and exclusive interview with Spence features on Volume 14 of the series DVD release.

Filmography

Film

Television

References

External links

Living people
Actresses from Kent
Australian people of Irish descent
Australian soap opera actresses
Australian stage actresses
Australian lesbian actresses
British lesbian actresses
English emigrants to Australia
English people of Irish descent
English people of Australian descent
English soap opera actresses
English stage actresses
English television actresses
20th-century Australian actresses
20th-century English actresses
21st-century Australian actresses
21st-century English actresses
Monash University alumni
Year of birth missing (living people)